MyDirtyHobby is a website owned by MindGeek focused on amateur pornography providing videos, photos and webcam shows.

Concept
MyDirtyHobby allows both users and performers to interact with each other through private messages and instant messaging.  
The performers on mydirtyhobby.com are mostly amateur models and cam girls. However, there are also some porn stars to be found, such as Vivian Schmitt and Emma Starr.

As of September 2015, over 370,000 videos and 3.8 million pictures uploaded on the website by more than 40,000 amateur performers.

Awards

2011 Sign Awards - Bestes Amateurportal 
2010 Venus Awards - Best Website Amateur National 
2011 Venus Awards - Best Amateur Website Germany 
2011 Venus Awards - Best New Amateur DVD Series Europe
2019 Venus Awards - Best Amateur Community

References

External links 
 

MindGeek
Canadian erotica and pornography websites
Internet properties established in 2006